This article presents a list of the historical events and publications of Australian literature during 1996.

Events 

 Christopher Koch won the Miles Franklin Award for Highways to a War
 David Malouf won the International Dublin Literary Award for Remembering Babylon

Major publications

Novels 

 Thea Astley, The Multiple Effects of Rainshadow
 James Cowan (author), A Mapmaker's Dream
 Robert Dessaix, Night Letters: A Journey Through Switzerland and Italy Edited and Annotated by Igor Miazmov
 Robert Drewe, The Drowner
 David Foster, The Glade Within the Grove
 Sonya Hartnett, Black Foxes
 David Malouf, The Conversations at Curlow Creek
 John A. Scott, Before I Wake
 Janette Turner Hospital, Oyster

Children's and young adult fiction 

 Margaret Clark (Australian writer), Fat Chance
 James Moloney, A Bridge to Wiseman's Cove
 Kerry Greenwood, The Broken Wheel
 John Marsden (writer), Checkers

Poetry 

 Eric Beach, Weeping for Lost Babylon
 Lisa Bellear, Dreaming In Urban Areas
 Judith Beveridge, Accidental Grace
 John Kinsella (poet), The Undertow: new and selected poems
 Anthony Lawrence (poet), The Viewfinder
 Les Murray (poet), Subhuman Redneck Poems
 Dorothy Porter, Crete
 Morgan Yasbincek, Night Reversing

Poetry anthologies 

 Dorothy Hewett, Collected Poems 1940–1995

Drama 

 Hilary Bell (writer), Wolf Lullaby
 Nick Enright, Blackrock
 Jenny Kemp (playwright), The Black Sequin Dress
 Debra Oswald, Gary's House
 David Williamson, Heretic

Science fiction and fantasy
 Sean Williams (author), Metal Fatigue

Crime 
 Peter Doyle (writer), Get Rich Quick
 Shane Maloney, The Brush-Off
 Peter Temple, Bad Debts

Fantasy 
 Sara Douglass
Enchanter
StarMan

Non-fiction 

 Bronwyn Donaghy, Anna's Story
 Doris Pilkington Garimara, Follow the Rabbit-Proof Fence

Awards and honours 

 Mavis Thorpe Clark  "for service to the arts as the author of children's literature and as an active member of the writer's organisations in Australia"
 Susanna de Vries  "for service to art as an author and lecturer in Australian and European art history and history"
 Christobel Mattingley  "for service to literature, particularly children's literature, and for community service through her commitment to social and cultural issues"

Deaths 
A list, ordered by date of death (and, if the date is either unspecified or repeated, ordered alphabetically by surname) of deaths in 1996 of Australian literary figures, authors of written works or literature-related individuals follows, including year of birth.
 12 February — Betty Roland, writer of plays, screenplays, novels, children's books and comics (born 1903)
 23 April — P. L. Travers, children's writer, best known for the Mary Poppins (book series) (born 1899)
 18 June
Godfrey Blunden, journalist and author (born 1906)
 Mena Calthorpe, writer (born 1905)
 27 October — Charlotte Jay, mystery writer and novelist who also wrote under her married name, Geraldine Halls (born 1919)
 29 November — Hugh V. Clarke, soldier, public servant and author, specialising in military history (born 1919)

See also 

 1996 in Australia
 1996 in literature
 1996 in poetry
 List of years in literature
 List of years in Australian literature

References 

1996 in Australia
Australian literature by year
20th-century Australian literature
1996 in literature